Kol or KOL may refer to:

Arts, entertainment and media

Fictional characters
 Kol, a character in Star Trek: Discovery
 Kol Skywalker, a member of the Skywalker family in Star Wars
 Isamot Kol, a DC Comics superhero

Other uses in arts, entertainment and media
 KKOL (AM), a radio station in Seattle, U.S., call sign KOL 1928–1975
 Kingdom of Loathing, a 2003 online game
 Radio KOL (Kids Online), an internet children's radio station 2003–2007

People
 Kol of Sweden (died c. 1173), Swedish prince
 Anton Kol (born 1990), Ukrainian Paralympic swimmer
 Moshe Kol (1911–1989), Israeli politician and Zionist activist
 Nellie van Kol (1851-1930), Dutch feminist, educator, and children's author
 Nigel Kol (born 1962), Australian rules footballer

Places
 Kol, Iran
 Kol, Nepal
 Kol Rural LLG, Papua New Guinea
 Aligarh, formerly known as Kol, Uttar Pradesh, India
 Kol Tehsil
 Kol, Raebareli, Uttar Pradesh, India

Other uses
 Kol people, a group of ethnicities of India
 Kol uprising 1831–1832
 Kol language (disambiguation), several languages
 Kol (dinosaur),

See also

 Kohl (disambiguation)
 Koli (disambiguation)
 Koll, a surname
 Key opinion leader, internet celebrity or a influencer
 Knights of Labor, 1880s US labor organization
 Kings of Leon, an American rock band

Language and nationality disambiguation pages